Zinf is a free audio player for Unix-like and Windows operating systems. Zinf is released under the GNU General Public License.

Zinf is a continuation of the FreeAmp project and uses the same source code.

Technical features
Zinf can play sound files in MP3, Vorbis, and WAV formats, among others.  It supports skins and is part of the MusicBrainz network. The player features an optimized version of the Xing MPEG decoder, a powerful music browser and playlist editor, and a built in download manager which supports downloading files from sites using the RMP (RealJukebox) download process.  Zinf was also notable for handling all audio files based on their metadata (Author, Album, Song Title), and hiding more-technical details like actual locations and file names (but these features are now standard in many players).

Naming
Zinf is a recursive acronym that stands for "Zinf Is Not FreeAmp!"  Use of the name FreeAmp had to be discontinued due to trademark issues, as "AMP" is a trademark of PlayMedia Systems, Inc.

History/Funding
The FreeAmp project was originally funded by EMusic, who paid the salaries of 3 developers working on the player.  Later, Relatable joined EMusic to help support continued development.

In January 2001, after 2 years of funding the project EMusic pulled their support, and subsequently fired the developers. The Zinf project was unable to find another sponsor, and development slowed greatly.  The most recent release was made in early 2004.  As of 2008, nearly all development of Zinf has ceased.

Adoption
Once a popular open-source Linux audio player, it has now been largely surpassed by newcomers such as Audacious, Amarok, Exaile, Banshee and (more recently) Songbird. This is largely because Zinf has not seen an official new release since early 2004, and many new features that are now standard in rival players have not been implemented; such as cover art and lyric support.

In 2010 the zinf.com website was bought by a domain squatter for the purpose of capitalizing on the site's traffic for monetary gains. A new link called "QnA" and "Ads" are now visible on the zinf.com website that is a redirect to the squatter's site.

References

External links

Audio player software that uses GTK
Free software programmed in C++
Cross-platform software
Free audio software
Free media players
Linux media players
Windows media players
2002 software